The 2022 Volleyball World Beach Pro Tour was the first edition of the global elite professional beach volleyball circuit organized by the Fédération Internationale de Volleyball (FIVB) for the 2022 beach volleyball season. Since March 2022, the Tour comprised three tiers: Future, Challenge and Elite 16. The season ended with The Finals featuring the 10 best teams in the world.

The Volleyball World Beach Pro Tour was established by FIVB in October 2021, thus it replaced the former FIVB Beach Volleyball World Tour.

Schedule

Key

Men

Women

Medal table by country

References

External links
2022 Beach Pro Tour at volleyballworld.com

 

World Tour
2022